Introducing the 3 Sounds is  the debut album by jazz group The Three Sounds featuring performances recorded in 1958 and released on the Blue Note label. The CD reissue includes five bonus tracks and one alternate take originally issued in Japan as Introducing the 3 Sounds Volume 2. It was a continuation of the Blue Note 1500 series being numbered 1600. A few other albums were made intended for release as 1601, 1602 etc. but were not released at the time.  Blue Note albums resumed with BLP (8)4001, (8)4002 etc. The 8 designating stereo.

Reception

The Allmusic review by Stephen Thomas Erlewine stated: "The Three Sounds never really deviated from the sound they established on Introducing, but that's one of the things that is so remarkable — they were fully formed on their very first album. Even if it was a peak, it wasn't the only peak in their career. They would often match the heights of this album, but this debut remains a shining jewel in their catalog, and the way to become acquainted with their sound".

Track listing
All compositions by Gene Harris except as indicated

 "Tenderly" (Walter Gross, Jack Lawrence) - 4:36
 "Willow Weep for Me" (Ann Ronell) - 4:42
 "Both Sides" - 4:41
 "Blue Bells" - 4:25
 "It's Nice" - 4:39
 "Goin' Home" (Traditional) - 3:54
 "Woody 'n' You" (Gillespie) - 7:12
 "'O Sole Mio" (Giovanni Capurro, Eduardo di Capua) - 3:56

Bonus tracks on CD reissue: (Previously released as Introducing The 3 Sounds Vol. 2)
"Bobby" - 4:26
 "Mo-Ge" - 4:25
 "It Might as Well Be Spring" (Hammerstein II, Rodgers) - 6:33
 "Soft Touch" - 3:43
 "Don't Get Around Much Anymore" (Ellington) - 4:39
 "Goin' Home" [Alternate take] - 5:38

Recorded on September 16 (tracks 1-3, 5, 9, 10 & 12), and September 18 (tracks 4, 6-8, 11, 13 & 14), 1958.

Personnel
Gene Harris - piano, celeste tracks 4, 6 and 14
Andrew Simpkins - bass featured on track 11
Bill Dowdy - drums

References

Blue Note Records albums
The Three Sounds albums
1959 debut albums
Albums produced by Alfred Lion
Albums recorded at Van Gelder Studio